Shemya (tàar ʃàmɲà) is the language of the Sinyar people. It is a Central Sudanic language spoken in Chad and formerly in Darfur, Sudan. It is variously spelled Shamya, Shamyan, Shemya, Sinya, and known as Symiarta, Taar Shamyan, Zimirra.

The language is spoken in Goz Beïda, Chad and Foro Boranga, Sudan. There are two level tones and downstepped low tones. Word order is SVO.

Dimmendaal leaves it as a language isolate, whereas Blench groups it with Formona.

Doornbos records 18 Sinyar clans. The Kijaar clan, located close to the Kujargé, likely intermarried with the Kujargé.

Lexicon
Sinyar appears to have a Bongo–Bagirmi superstratum and a non-Bongo–Bagirmi substratum. Some lexical items in Sinyar have cognates in Bongo–Bagirmi languages (particularly the neighboring Yulu-Gula group), while others do not.

Sinyar lexical items without Bongo-Bagirmi cognates

Sinyar lexical items with Bongo-Bagirmi cognates

Sinyar numerals from Boyeldieu (2013):

Numerals

Pronouns
Sinyar pronouns:
Sinyar pronouns

References

Languages of Chad
Bongo–Bagirmi languages
Unclassified languages of Africa